Van Buren Township is one of ten townships in Daviess County, Indiana. As of the 2010 census, its population was 2,552 and it contained 657 housing units. The population grew 30% since the 2000 census, when the population was 1,960.

History
Van Buren Township was organized in September 1841; the last township to be formed in Daviess County, it was created in response to a petition circulated among residents of parts of Barr and Madison townships, praying to be set off as a separate township.  In the first years of settlement, present-day Van Buren Township attracted few pioneers; most individuals in the area were trappers or hunters, and permanent settlement only began in the late 1820s.

Geography

Unincorporated towns
 Raglesville

Adjacent townships
 Madison Township (north)
 Perry Township, Martin County (east)
 Barr Township (south)
 Bogard Township (west)
 Elmore Township (northwest)

Cemeteries
The township contains five cemeteries: Evans Memorial Park, Franklin, Kilgore, Liberty and Stoll.

References
 United States Census Bureau cartographic boundary files
 U.S. Board on Geographic Names

External links
 Indiana Township Association
 United Township Association of Indiana

Townships in Daviess County, Indiana
Townships in Indiana
1841 establishments in Indiana
Populated places established in 1841